Seán McComb (born 14 August 1992) is an Irish professional boxer. As an amateur he won a bronze medal at the 2015 European Games.

Career

McComb trains at the Holy Trinity club, Belfast.

McComb won bronze at the 2015 European Games in Baku.

Personal life

McComb was fined and issued with ban after an incident outside a nightclub in 2018.

Professional boxing record

References

Living people
1992 births
Boxers from Belfast
Male boxers from Northern Ireland
Irish male boxers
Boxers at the 2015 European Games
European Games bronze medalists for Ireland
European Games medalists in boxing
Lightweight boxers
Light-welterweight boxers
Southpaw boxers